The Knowing is the third full-length album by the American death-doom band Novembers Doom, released in 2000.

Track listing

Personnel
 Paul Kuhr - vocals, design, layout
 Joe Nunez - drums
 Eric Burnley - guitars, keyboards (vocals track 10)
 Mary Bielich - bass
 Larry Roberts - guitars

Additional personnel and staff
 Sophie Kopecky - vocals (track 8)
 Sarah Wilson - vocals (tracks 7 & 8)
 Travis Smith - cover art
 Chris Wisco - recording, mixing
 Tom Weis - photography

References

2000 albums
Novembers Doom albums